The Fargo Air Museum is an aviation related museum in Fargo, North Dakota. It is located at Hector International Airport in the northern part of the city. The museum includes many historic aircraft of which 90% are in flying condition.

History 
The museum broke ground on a Beck-Odegaard Wing in August 2013. In 2016, the museum acquired a 1944 tractor that served as an aircraft tug at Naval Air Station Atlantic City during World War II.

Aircraft on display

Airworthy aircraft 

 Aero L-39 Albatros
 Cessna O-1 Bird Dog
 Douglas DC-3 "Duggy"
 Fairchild PT-19
 Focke-Wulf Fw 190 – Half-scale model
 Lancair 360
 Meyer's Little Toot
 North American Harvard Mk IV
 North American P-51D Mustang
 Piper J-3 Cub
 Piper PA-46-350P Malibu Mirage
 Rearwin Skyranger
 Rutan Long-EZ
 Schleicher K7
 Taylorcraft L-2
 Velocity SE-FG

Static display aircraft 

 Bell UH-1 Iroquois
 General Atomics MQ-1 Predator
 McDonnell F-101B Voodoo
 North American B-25 Mitchell
 Northrop Grumman RQ-4 Global Hawk – 1:1 Scale Model
 Pitts Special
 PZL TS-11 Iskra
 Standard J-1
 Vultee BT-13 Valiant – Under restoration
 Wright Flyer – Replica

See also
 American Wings Air Museum
 Dakota Territory Air Museum
 Fagen Fighters WWII Museum
 Wings of the North Air Museum
 List of aerospace museums

References

External links

Fargo Air Museum

Aerospace museums in North Dakota
Museums in Fargo, North Dakota